Fantasy Lords is a line of miniatures published by Grenadier subsidiary Pinnacle Products.

Contents
Fantasy Lords is a boxed set containing eleven scale model metal figures, with water-based paint in eight colors, two plastic trays, a brush, and painting instructions.

Reception
Steve Jackson reviewed Fantasy Lords in The Space Gamer No. 62. Jackson commented that "Recommended, especially as a gift for a friend whom you'd like to start in the miniatures hobby."

Ian Knight reviewed Fantasy Lords for Imagine magazine, and stated that "a very nice set; leaving aside the reservation that boxed figures usually work out more expensive per item than those bought individually, they are otherwise thoroughly recommended!"

Edwin J. Rotondaro reviewed the Fantasy Lords Blister Pack Series released in 1984 in Space Gamer No. 71. Rotondaro commented that "The detail and originality of these figures alone would make them a must for any serious collector of 25mm miniatures [...]  If you use miniatures in your fantasy roleplaying, the new Fantasy Lords blister packs are highly recommended."

Mike Brunton reviewed Official Bushido 25mm Miniatures and Fantasy Lords for Imagine magazine, and stated that "Overall: Tick, VG, and recommended, for both Bushido and Fantasy Lords."

The Fantasy Lords line was awarded the H.G. Wells Award for "Best Fantasy or Science Fiction Figure Series of 1986 ".

References

See also
List of lines of miniatures

Miniature figures
Origins Award winners